Richard Cowan may refer to:

Richard David Cowan (1909–1939), long-term companion of Stewart Mitchell
Richard Sumner Cowan (1921–1997), American botanist
Richard Cowan (soldier) (1922–1944), American soldier
Richard O. Cowan (born 1935), historian of the Church of Jesus Christ of Latter-day Saints
Richard Cowan (cannabis activist) (born 1940), American cannabis activist
Rich Cowan (born 1956), American politician, film producer and director
Richard Cowan (bass-baritone) (1957–2015), American opera singer

See also
Riki Cowan (born 1963), New Zealand rugby league player